Mount Zion Temple is a Reform synagogue located in St. Paul, Minnesota, United States. Founded in 1856 as Mount Zion Hebrew Association, it was the first Jewish congregation in Minnesota. The congregation was formed before the statehood of Minnesota in 1858.

Early history

Founded in 1856 by eight German-Jewish families, Mount Zion Hebrew Association (as it was then called) was the very first Jewish congregation in Minnesota. Through the 1860s the congregation met in rented rooms around St. Paul before their first building was completed in 1871, located at East Tenth Street and Minnesota Street in the Lowertown district. Early on the congregation was divided by a group called Ahabath Ahim, which branched off then returned. 1871 was the year Rabbi Leopold Wintner began as Mount Zion's first and Minnesota's first Rabbi. In 1871, the congregation built the first Synagogue in the state. The same year they founded the Hebrew Ladies Benevolent Society, members of which organized Neighborhood House to serve immigrants in the community. The Rabbis and congregants of Mount Zion are still board members of Neighborhood House.

Emanuel Hess, who had been born in Meerholz, Germany in 1845, became rabbi in 1888. He had previously served as rabbi of Temple Israel of Columbus, Ohio in 1876–1877, and then Congregation B'nai Zion in Shreveport, Louisiana, where he served until 1888. Hess was rabbi of Mount Zion until his death in 1906.

In the 1940s the congregation participated in recreations such as "The Jewish Home Beautiful" which shared traditions of daily life. In 1948, began the leadership of Rabbi Gunther Plaut, who published books on the congregation's history and on the Jewish history of Minnesota.

 
In the 1950s, the congregation chose the prominent avant-garde architect Erich Mendelsohn to design a building for them. After projects in Europe, the Soviet Union, Israel and America – this was his final building, and it was completed after his death in 1953. The congregation moved into the current building in 1956, 100 years after it was first founded. It is located on Summit Avenue.

In 2002, the Mount Zion Temple was part of a radio program that detailed their restoration of Torah scrolls. In 2007, 690 families were members of the congregation.  the rabbis were Adam Stock Spilker and Esther Adler, and the cantors were Rachel Stock Spilker and Jen Strauss-Klein.

See also
List of Minnesota Synagogues

References

External links
 Mount Zion Temple website
 Finding aid to the Mount Zion Temple records at the Upper Midwest Jewish Archives, University of Minnesota Libraries.

Further reading 
 Plaut, W. Gunther. (1956). Mount Zion, 1856–1956: The First Hundred Years. St. Paul, Minn.: North Central Pub. Co. 
 Wark, M. A. B., Melamed, N., Ross, H. C., Kelberg, F., & Mount Zion Hebrew Congregation (Saint Paul, Minn.). (2009). Mount Zion Temple 150th anniversary commemorative book: 2006-2007/5766-5767. Saint Paul, MN: Mount Zion Hebrew Congregation.

1856 establishments in Minnesota Territory
Buildings and structures in Saint Paul, Minnesota
Erich Mendelsohn buildings
Gothic Revival architecture in Minnesota
Gothic Revival synagogues
Jews and Judaism in Minneapolis–Saint Paul
Reform synagogues in Minnesota
Religious buildings and structures completed in 1953
Religious organizations established in 1856